Anatoly Aleksandrovich Roshchin (10 March 1932 – 5 January 2016) was a heavyweight Greco-Roman wrestler from Russia. Between 1962 and 1972 he won nine medals at the Summer Olympics and world championships, including four gold medals.

Roshchin lost his father during World War II and had to start working as a shepherd aged 10. In 1950, seeking a better job, he moved from his village to Moscow. At the time he trained in weightlifting and basketball and changed to wrestling only in 1954, while serving in the Soviet Navy. His career was interrupted in 1957, when he was diagnosed with a thyroid disorder that required a complex surgery. He recovered by 1960, and in 1961 placed second at the Soviet championships. He also placed second at the 1962 World Championships and 1964 and 1968 Olympics, losing to István Kozma on all occasions, but won the world and Olympic titles in 1963, 1969, 1970 and 1972.

Roshchin needed to wind himself up 10–15 minutes before a bout, and for this purpose would often start a friendly verbal brawl with teammates. By 1972, when he was 40 years old, he was already working as a coach and looking into retirement. He was convinced to compete at the Munich Olympics by the Soviet Sports minister Sergey Pavlov, and won the gold medal. In the last bout he won by default against Wilfried Dietrich, who had a spectacular victory earlier in the tournament and did not want to spoil it by a potential loss. Roshchin retired after the Olympics and later worked as a sports instructor and an international wrestling referee.

References

External links
 

1932 births
2016 deaths
Soviet male sport wrestlers
Olympic wrestlers of the Soviet Union
Wrestlers at the 1964 Summer Olympics
Wrestlers at the 1968 Summer Olympics
Wrestlers at the 1972 Summer Olympics
Russian male sport wrestlers
Olympic gold medalists for the Soviet Union
Olympic silver medalists for the Soviet Union
Olympic medalists in wrestling
Medalists at the 1964 Summer Olympics
Medalists at the 1968 Summer Olympics
Honoured Masters of Sport of the USSR
Recipients of the Order of Lenin
Medalists at the 1972 Summer Olympics